Loam is a ghost town located in southwestern Jackson County, Kentucky, United States. The town was located along Horse Lick Creek. It is located southwest of McKee by 7 miles, and 2.7 miles northwest of another ghost town, Dango. The town is located on Bethel Church Road according to the KYTC's State Primary Road System map for Jackson County. Heavy settlement and farming occurred in the area around Horse Lick Creek until the early 1900s. The area where Loam was is currently occupied by the Daniel Boone National Forest, in the Horse Lick Creek Biopreserve, with the majority of ownership being private.

The town had a post office. It is unknown when it opened or closed.

References

Unincorporated communities in Jackson County, Kentucky
Ghost towns in Kentucky